Sayula II is a Swan 65 yacht designed by Sparkman & Stephens. She won the 1973–74 Whitbread Round the World Race skippered by Ramón Carlin. In 2016, the race was featured in a documentary film called The Weekend Sailor.

1973–74 Sayula II crew
The race crew was:
Ramon Carlin,
Francisca “Paquita” Larios,
Enrique Carlin,
Adolfo “Cantis” Orenday,
Roberto Cubas Carlin,
Francisco Reyes Carlin,
Butch Darylmple-Smith,
Keith Lorence,
David Bowen,
Bob Martin,
Ray Conrady, and
Tjerk Romke de Vries.

References

Individual sailing vessels
Volvo Ocean Race yachts
Sailing yachts of Mexico
Sailing yachts built in Finland
Sailboat types built by Nautor Swan
Sailboat type designs by Olin Stephens
Sailboat type designs by Sparkman and Stephens
Sailboat type designs by American designers